Dwight Alexis Lewis Padron (born October 7, 1987) is an American-Venezuelan professional basketball player.

College career
Lewis played college basketball at USC, with the USC Trojans.

Professional career
In his pro career, Lewis has played in the 1st-tier FIBA Americas League.

National team career
Lewis represented the senior men's Venezuelan national basketball team at the 2015 FIBA Americas Championship and the 2016 South American Championship, where he won gold medals. He also played at the men's basketball competition at the 2016 Summer Olympics.

References

External links
Twitter
FIBA Profile
FIBA Game Center Profile
Latinbasket.com Profile
Draftexpress.com Profile
RealGM.com Profile
USC College Bio

1987 births
Living people
American expatriate basketball people in Romania
American expatriate basketball people in Spain
American men's basketball players
Basketball players at the 2016 Summer Olympics
Basketball players at the 2019 Pan American Games
Gimnasia y Esgrima de Comodoro Rivadavia basketball players
Olympic basketball players of Venezuela
Shooting guards
Small forwards
Trotamundos B.B.C. players
USC Trojans men's basketball players
Venezuelan men's basketball players
Venezuelan expatriate basketball people in Argentina
Venezuelan expatriate basketball people in Spain
Venezuelan expatriate basketball people in the United States
Venezuelan expatriate sportspeople in Romania
Venezuelan people of American descent
2019 FIBA Basketball World Cup players
Pan American Games competitors for Venezuela
Basketball players at the 2015 Pan American Games